Mooney is a family name, which is probably predominantly derived from the Irish Ó Maonaigh, pronounced Om-weeneey. It can also be spelled Moony, Moonie, Mainey, Mauney, Meaney and Meeney depending on the dialectic pronunciation that was anglicised.

Origins
The origin of the Moony or Mooney families is lost in antiquity. The name is derived from maoin, a Gaelic word meaning wealth or treasure of treasure, hence when O'Maonaigh was anglicised to Mooney it meant the descendant of the wealthy one.

According to Irish lore, the Mooney family comes from one of the largest and most noble Irish lines. They are said to be descendants of the ancient Irish King Heremon, who, along with his brother Herber, conquered Ireland.  Heremon slew his brother shortly after their invasion, took the throne for himself, and fathered a line of kings of Ireland that include Malachi II, and King Niall of the Nine Hostages.

Baptismal records, parish records, ancient land grants, the Annals of the Four Masters, and books by O'Hart, McLysaght, and O'Brien were all used in researching the history of the Mooney family name. These varied and often ancient records indicate that distant septs of the name arose in several places throughout Ireland. The most known and most numerous sept came from the county of Offaly. The members of this sept were from Chieftain Monach, son of Ailill Mor, Lord of Ulster, who was descended from the Kings of Connacht. These family members gave their name to town lands called Ballymooney both in that county and in the neighbouring county of Leix.

People with the surname
Al Mooney (1906–1986), aircraft designer and founder of Mooney Airplane Company
Alex Mooney (born 1971), member of Congress from West Virginia
Bel Mooney (born 1946), English journalist and broadcaster
Brian Mooney (born 1966), professional football player
C. P. J. Mooney (1865–1926), American newspaper publisher
Cameron Mooney (born 1979), Australian rules footballer
Carol Ann Mooney (fl. 1970s–2010s), president of Saint Mary's College in Notre Dame, Indiana
Charles Mooney (born 1951), American boxer
Charles ("Chuck") W. Mooney Jr. (born 1947), American, the Charles A. Heimbold, Jr. Professor of Law, and former interim dean, at the University of Pennsylvania Law School
Chris Mooney (basketball) (born 1972), American basketball coach
Darnell Mooney (born 1997), American football player
Dave Mooney (born 1984), professional football player
Debra Mooney (born 1947), American actress
Edward Aloysius Mooney (1882–1958), Roman Catholic Cardinal Archbishop of Detroit, former Bishop of Rochester
Edward F. Mooney (born 1941), noted Kierkegaard scholar and Professor of Religion at Syracuse University
Francie Mooney (1922–2006), musician, fiddler
Hercules Mooney (1715–1800), American Revolutionary War colonel
James Mooney (1861–1921), anthropologist whose major works were about Native American Indians
Jason Mooney (disambiguation), multiple people
John Mooney (disambiguation), multiple people
Kathi Mooney (fl. 2010s–2020s), American scientist
Kevin Mooney (born 1962), Irish musician
Kyle Mooney (born 1984), American comic actor, Saturday Night Live
Malcolm Mooney (born 1944), original lead singer of rock group Can
Matt Mooney (born 1997), American basketball player
Melvin Mooney (1893–1968), American physicist, developed the Mooney viscometer and other testing equipment used in the rubber industry
Paschal Mooney (born 1947), Irish politician
Peter Mooney (conductor) (1915–1983), Scottish educationalist and conductor (music)
Peter Mooney (footballer) (born 1897), English professional footballer
Paul Mooney (writer) (1904–1939), son of James Mooney
Paul Mooney (comedian) (1941–2021), American comedian, writer, and actor
Ralph Mooney (1928–2011), Bakersfield sound steel-guitar player who backed Buck Owens, Merle Haggard and others
Robert Mooney (1873–1953), Canadian politician
Sean Mooney (born 1959), sports reporter and former WWF announcer
Shay Mooney (fl. 2010s–2020s), singer of country duo Dan + Shay
Shona Mooney (born c. 1984), Scottish fiddler
Ted Mooney (1951–2022), American author
Thomas Mooney (1882–1942), American labour leader from San Francisco, California
Tim Mooney (1958–2012), American musician
Tom Mooney (rugby league) (born 1952), Australian rugby league footballer
Tommy Mooney (born 1971), professional football player
Tony Mooney (fl. 1970s–2010s), Australian politician
Walter E. Mooney (1925–1990), pilot and model aircraft designer

Fictional characters
"Albert Mooney" is also a character in the Irish folk-song "I'll Tell Me Ma"
"Officer Mooney" is a policer officer who interacts with Superman in the 1978 movie

See also
Mooney (disambiguation)

References

Surnames of Irish origin